Paul Daimler (13 September 1869 – 15 December 1945) was a German mechanical engineer who designed automobiles. He was the eldest child of Gottlieb Daimler who founded Daimler-Motoren-Gesellschaft and (with Wilhelm Maybach) invented the petrol engine.

After studying at the Technische Hochschule Stuttgart, he worked in his father's factory in Cannstatt. On 10 November 1885 he travelled with his father in the "riding car"—the world's first motorcycle—from Cannstatt to Untertürkheim. In 1902, Paul was sent to the general partners of Austro-Daimler, where he became the technical director. In 1903, he designed an armoured car. From 1907 to 1922 he was Technical Director of Daimler-Motoren-Gesellschaft Untertürkheim, Sindelfingen and Berlin-Marienfelde. On 1 July 1923, he joined Horch, part of Argus Motoren Gesellschaft and made a name for himself there as a developer in the department of motor aircraft engines, remaining until 1928.

Examples of his work include the hydraulic valve lifters, which he introduced in 1931.

Publications

References

 
 
 

1869 births
1945 deaths
Daimler Motoren Gesellschaft
German automotive pioneers
Engineers from Stuttgart
20th-century German inventors
People associated with the internal combustion engine